The 1965 Eastern Michigan Hurons football team represented Eastern Michigan University in the Presidents' Athletic Conference (PAC) during the 1965 NCAA College Division football season. In their first season under head coach Jerry Raymond, the Hurons compiled a 3–4–1 record (3–1–1 against PAC opponents) and were outscored by their opponents, 129 to 125.

In the middle of August 1965, Fred Trosko, who had been the head football coach since 1952, abruptly quit. Jerry Raymond, an Eastern Michigan alumnus who had been the school's freshman football coach, was named as Trosko's replacement.

Schedule

References

Eastern Michigan
Eastern Michigan Eagles football seasons
Eastern Michigan Hurons football